Sunset State Beach is a park and beach on Monterey Bay,  in Santa Cruz County, California.

It is operated by the California Department of Parks and Recreation.

Geography
It is approximately 1.5 miles (2.5 km) long, and located near Watsonville.

It is surrounded by large agricultural fields west of the city of Watsonville. Manresa State Beach is to the north-upcoast of Sunset State Beach.

See also
 
 List of California beaches

References

External links 
 California Department of Parks and Recreation: Sunset State Beach website
 Sunset State Beach Park Brochure

California State Beaches
Beaches of Santa Cruz County, California
Parks in Santa Cruz County, California
Monterey Bay
Beaches of Northern California